Adrien Buttafocchi (18 September 1907 – 29 June 1937) was a French racing cyclist. He rode the Tour de France in 1931, 1932, 1933 and 1934, but he never finished one.

References

1907 births
1937 deaths
French male cyclists
Place of birth missing